This list of photographic equipment makers lists companies that manufacture (or license manufacture from other companies) equipment for photography.

Camera and lens manufacturers 
Note that producers whose only presence in the photo industry at any time has been the manufacture of digital cameras (Logitech, for example, which has made Webcams) are listed separately on the List of digital camera brands.

There is not a very clear distinguishing line between camera producers and lens producers; many companies do both, or have done both at one time or another. Some camera manufacturers sell lenses made by others as their own, in an OEM arrangement. Some camera makers design lenses but outsource manufacture. Some lens makers have cameras made to sell under their own brand name. A few companies are only in the lens business. Some camera companies make no lenses, but usually at least sell a lens from some lens maker with their cameras as part of a package.

Note that many optical instruments such as microscopes, telescopes, spotting scopes and so forth can be used as photographic lenses; manufacturers of these types of equipment are not included here (unless they also make more conventional photo gear).

Manufacturers of cameras or lenses and filters 
ALPA
Andor Technology
Angenieux
apertus°
Argus
 Arnold & Richter (see Arri)
Arri
 Asahi (see Pentax)
Bell & Howell Co.
BELOMO
Blackmagic Design
Bolex
 Braun Nurnberg
Bron Elektronik
 B+W Filterfabrik (owned by Schneider Kreuznach).
Cambo camera
Canham
Canon
Casio
Century Precision Optics (owned by Schneider Kreuznach)
Chamonix
Cokin
Cooke
Cosina
 Deardorff
Ebony (large-format cameras, folding and non-folding, ranging from 6x9cm to 20x24in)
Escura
Exakta
Folmer and Schwing
 Formatt Hitech
Fujifilm
Fujinon (see Fujifilm)
Gibellini
Gowland
Hartblei
Hasselblad
Heliopan
Holga
Ikegami
Ilford
 Intrepid
IMAX
 Kaiser Fototechnik
Kiev-Arsenal
Kino Precision (makers of Kiron and Vivitar Series 1 lenses)
Kenko (part of KenkoTokina Corporation)
Kodak
Kowa
Krasnogorsky Mekanicheski Zavod (also known as KMZ, makers of Zorki, Zenit, Horizon cameras, Zenitar lenses)
 Laowa see Venus Optics
Leica
Lensbaby
Linhof
Littmann
LOMO (Leningradskoye Optiko Mechanichesckoye Obyedinenie)
Lytro (makers of consumer plenoptic cameras)
Mamiya (part of Phase One)
MegaVision
Meyer Optik Görlitz
Minolta
Minox
 Mitakon Zhongyi see Zhong Yi Optics
Nikon
Noblex
Olympus
Panasonic
 Panon (see Widelux)
Pentax
Phase One
Plaubel
Polaroid
Profoto
Ricoh
Rodenstock
Ross
Samsung
Samyang Optics (Samyang SLR lenses are also branded as Vivitar, Rokinon, Walimex, Bower or Pro-Optic.)
Seagull Camera
Schneider Kreuznach
Shen Hao
Sigma
Silvestri
Sinar
 Sirui
Soligor
Sony
Steinheil
Stenopeika
Sunpak
Tamron (Second shareholder is Sony)
 Taylor, Taylor and Hobson (now known as Cooke)
Tiffen
Tokina (part of KenkoTokina Corporation)
Toyo
Vageeswari
Venus Optics (brand: Laowa)
Vivitar
Voigtländer (name used under license; original company defunct)
 Wratten see Tiffen (makes the products) and Kodak (owns the brand)
Walz
 Wista
 Wisner
Yongnuo
 Y's (large format camera maker in Japan)
Zeiss
Zenit see KMZ
 Zhong Yi Optics
 Zone VI
Zorki see KMZ
 Zuiko see Olympus

Former producers of film cameras who now make digital cameras 
Kyocera as of 2005, only cellphone cameras
Polaroid
Ricoh
Sanyo

Former producers of cameras or lenses and filters 
ADOX
Agfa
Ansco
 Atoms (Calypso underwater camera)
 Beauty (formerly Taiyodo Koki)
Carl Braun Camera-Werk
Bronica
 Burke & James (Rembrandt View Portrait Camera; 5x7 plate format)
Chinon Industries
Contax
Corfield Ltd (Early British camera maker, created the Corfield Periflex)
Coronet Camera Company
Otto Berning Gmbh. (Made the Robot)
Bell & Howell
Chinon
 David White Company (Stereo Realist)
DHW Fototechnik (see Rollei)
Ducati 
FED
Feinmess Dresden
Ferrania
Franka Kamerawerk
Graflex
Honeywell
Ihagee
Ilford (still produces film and chemicals) 
J. Lancaster & Son
Keystone (126 and 110 cameras with built-in flash, movie cameras)
Kiron Lenses
Konica
 Konishiroku (see Konica Minolta)
Konica Minolta (as of 2006 may still manufacture on an OEM basis for Sony)
Leitz (formerly owned Leica)
Leidolf
 Lord see Okaya
Meopta (still produces many optical products)
Minolta
Micro Precision Products
Miranda
 MPP (see Micro Precision Products)
Nicca 
Nimslo (4 lens 35mm 3D camera)
Norita
Okaya
OPL
 Orion see Miranda
Pentacon (Praktica)
PerkinElmer
Petri Founded 1907 as 'Kuribayashi Camera Works'
Rectaflex
Rollei
Robot See Otto Berning
Steinheil 
 Sunagor
Tessina
Thornton-Pickard
Topcon (still manufactures optical instruments)
 Tokyo Optical see Topcon
 Tower (a house brand of Sears)
VE-JA-DE Products, owned and founded by Vincent Joseph Dunker
Vivitar
Wollensak
Wray
Yashica 
 Zenza see Bronica

List of camera accessory makers 

Adorama
Blackmagic Design 
Beseler
Bowens
Cactus
Crumpler
Domke
Gary Fong
 Godox
Foba
Gitzo
Hama
Hoya
Leaf
Lee Filters
LPA Design
 LumoPro
Manfrotto
 MagnetMod (or MagMod)
Meopta
Metz
Micro Precision Products
 MPP (see Micro Precision Products)
 Novoflex
 Neewer
Panasonic
 Paul C. Buff
Phottix
Polaroid
Profoto
Sigma
SLIK
Sun Ray Photo Company
Sunpak
Tamrac
Think Tank Photo
Tiffen
Triggertrap
Velbon
Vivitar
 Westcott
Yongnuo

List of photographic film, paper & chemistry brands and manufacturers 
Note films, paper and chemicals may be sold by a manufacturer who has produced the product under their own brand or alternatively under a brand name owned by one party, with manufacture and packaging of the product outsourced to third parties as well as many permutations of these options. Therefore, this list includes both brands and manufacturers with information (where known) on their current capability.

Current 
ADOX (Germany) Brand of B&W & Colour films, papers and chemistry. (Film 3rd party commissioned and Agfa-gevaert material) Film conversion capability. Resurrecting an Agfa Coater and access to former Ilford Imaging (Marly, Switzerland) coater.
Agfa-Gevaert (Belgium) Manufacturer of B&W Aerofilms & Microfilms. Business to business.
AgfaPhoto Holdings GMBH (Germany) Brand of B&W films. (Manufacture by Harman Technology)
 Bellini (Italy) Manufacture of photographic chemicals
Bergger (France) Brand of B&W film (Manufacture by Inoviscoat) .
 Calbe Chemie (Germany) Manufacture of photographic chemicals (formerly part of Agfa Wolfen/ORWO)
 Carestream (USA) Manufacture of Kodak RA4 papers. (Formerly part of Kodak).
 Champion (Malaysia) Manufacture of photographic chemicals
 Compard (Germany) Manufacture/packing of photographic chemicals (ex Agfa products formerly supplied by Agfa chemical plant in Vaihingen-Enzs closed 2015)
Cinestill (USA) Converting/packing Kodak Motion Picture film without Remjet layer.
 FILM Ferrania (Italy) Small scale manufacturer of B&W film
 Film Washi (France) Handcrafted B&W film.
Foma Bohemia (Czech Republic) Manufacture of B&W films, X-Ray and Industrial films & contract manufacture. B&W photographic chemicals and papers
 Fotospeed (UK) Brand of photographic chemicals and papers
Fujifilm (Japan) Manufacture of Black and white and color film, instant film, Microfilms & RA4 paper. Fuji Hunt subsidiary producing color photographic chemicals.
Harman Technology (UK) Manufacturer of B&W films & photographic papers under ILFORD and Kentmere Brands. Also contract manufacture. B&W chemicals (produced by Tetenal)
 Inoviscoat (Germany) Manufactures film components for other brands, including Impossible Project, ADOX) Business to business, now part of ORWO.
 Island Polymer Industries, Triacetate Cellulose (TAC) film production using former ORWO Wolfen facility, largest cast film manufacturer in Europe.
 Kentmere (UK) Brand of B&W film and papers - see Harman Technology
Kodak (USA) Manufacture of B&W & Color film including Cine films.
Kodak Alaris (UK) Distribution and marketing of Kodak still products and B&W Photographic chemicals. (RA4 Paper and color chemicals business sold to Sinopromise in 2020).
 Kono! (Austria) B&W and 'Creative' pre exposed color films.(using 3rd party stock)
Lomography (Austria) Brand. B&W & Color films. (Manufacture by Kodak (Color negative) & Foma (B&W) & Inoviscoat (special colors/Kino films)
 Moersch (Germany) Photographic chemicals
 Oriental (Japan) Brand. B&W film (Manufacture by Harman Technology)
ORWO (Germany) Brand of Filmotec. B&W cinefilms. Now merged with Inoviscoat under ORWO brand.
Polaroid B.V. (Netherlands) (was Impossible Project, then Polaroid Originals) Manufacturer of B&W and color instant film.
 Rera (Japan) Conversion of B&W and color reversal film for 127 cameras (using 3rd party stock)
 Revelog (Austria) Creative (pre-exposed) color films. (using 3rd party stock)
Rollei (Germany) Brand of Maco Photo Products B&W and Color film. (Manufactured by Agfa-Gevaert and Harman Technology). B&W/Color photographic chemicals
 Shanghai (China) Manufacturer of B&W film, re-packaged ORWO cinefilms
 Silberra (Russia) Brand of B&W films (Converting/packing Agfa-Gevaert B&W aerofilms)
 Sinopromise (China) Kodak Flexicolor Chemistry and conversion/packing of Kodak RA4 paper. (Coated by Carestream)
 Slavich (Russia) Manufacture of B&W photographic paper; Micron Division, photographic plates and films.
 SPUR (Germany) Manufacture of photographic chemicals
Svema (Ukraine) Brand of Astrum Holdings. Converting/packing 3rd party B&W & Color aerofilms
Tasma (Russia) Manufacturer of Aerofilms. Business to business only.
 Tetenal (Germany) Manufacture/packing of photographic chemicals under own brand and for Ilford & Kodak. Receivership in 2018.
 Yodica (Italy) Creative (pre-exposed) color films. (using 3rd party stock)

Former 
AgfaPhoto GMBH (Leverkusen, Germany) Major producer of B&W and color negative and reversal films, papers and chemicals. Spun off from Agfa-Gevaert in 2004. Production ended 2005. Now a brand under Agfaphoto Holdings GMBH.
Lucky Film (China) Manufacture of B&W & Color films. Ceased photographic film production in 2012 (Color) 2018 (B&W).
Efke (Yugoslavia/Croatia) Manufacture of B&W films (the old ADOX formulas) and IR film. Closed 2012.
 ERA (China) Manufacture of B&W film. 80% holding acquired by Kodak China in 1998. Closed 2008
Ferrania (Italy) Major producer of B&W film, cine film, color negative and reversal white label films and own Solaris brand. Closed 2012, Formerly owned by 3M and spun out into Imation. Sold x-ray business to Kodak. See FILM Ferrania.
 Forte (Hungary) Manufacture of B&W film. Closed 2007
 Fuda (China) Manufacture of B&W and Color film. Closed 
Hindustan Photo Films (India)
 Ilford Imaging (Switzerland) Ilfochrome/Cibachrome. Sold in 2005, plant closed 2013. See ADOX.
 Ilford Imaging (UK) B&W film. Receivership 2004. Rescued in management buy out. See Harman Technology.
 Kentmere (UK) B&W Papers. Acquired by Harman Technology 2007. Plant in Kentmere, Cumbria closed.
Konica (Japan) Major color film producer including white label brands, merged with Minolta, Closed film business in 2006.
 Negra (Spain) Manufacture of B&W film. Closed 1984 
ORWO (Germany) (bankrupt 1995, Trademark sold to two different companies. Motion Picture stock now made by Filmotec, processing business sold to another firm.) See ORWO.
Perutz-Photowerke (founded in 1880 by Otto Perutz, since 1964 owned by Agfa, closed down in 1994)
Polaroid (USA) Bankrupt 2001 & 2008. See Polaroid B.V.
 Revue (a label owned by PhotoQelle, a subsidiary of Quelle, known as Arcandor today; several sources claim that Revue films were actually repackaged stock leftover of other companies, first Fuji/3M, later Agfa)
Svema (Ukraine) Major soviet manufacturer of B&W, Colour negative and reversal film. Ceased production of film in 2000. Now a brand owned by Astrum.
Valca (Spain), Manufacture of B&W & X-ray film, from 1940 to 1993.

List of darkroom equipment manufacturers

Current 
 AP Photo Industries (Spain) Darkroom equipment, film cartridges and cartridge loading equipment, disposable cameras
 Beseler (USA) Photographic enlargers
 De Vere (UK) Digital enlargers. Previous manufacturer of quality analog photographic enlargers.
 Dunco Photographic enlargers
 Jobo (US) Film/Photo processors
Fujifilm (Japan) Frontier minlabs
 Kaiser (Germany) Photographic enlargers and easels
 Kienzle(Germany) Photographic enlargers
 LPL (Japan) Photographic enlargers and easels
Noritsu (Japan) dry/wet minlabs
 Nova darkroom (UK) Film/Photo process equipment
 Omega (USA) Photographic enlargers
 Paterson (UK) Photo processing equipment
 SDS (UK) Manufacture of RH Designs exposure meters

Former 
Agfa (Germany) Photographic enlargers, minilabs
Durst (Italy) Photographic enlargers and related products, ceased production in 2007. Now produces inkjet printers
 Meopta (Czech Republic/US) Ceased Photographic enlarger production 2006.
 Leitz (Germany) Focomat photographic enlargers
Konica Minolta (Japan) Minlabs, photographic enlargers, film scanners. Exited photo business in 2006.
 Phototherm (USA) Sidekick photo processors. Ceased production/support 2018.
 Photon Beard (UK) Easels. Main specialism lighting.

List of semiconductor sensor makers or designers 
Sensor types CCD, CMOS, NMOS, PMOS
Canon
Dalsa (formerly part of Philips)
Foveon
Fujifilm, designers of the Super CCD
Matsushita
Nikon (designs, but as of 2006 does not yet fabricate)
Sony
Samsung Digital Imaging, part of Samsung Corporation
Toshiba

See also
Comparison of digital SLRs

References

External links
 Extended list of camera manufacturers at camerapedia
 Camera Manufacturing Companies Family Tree - clusters of interconnected companies (mergers, acquisitions, split-ups).

ЕПТД
Photography companies
Photography equipment
Photographic equipment makers
Lists of photography topics